An explosion crater is a type of crater formed when material is ejected from the surface of the ground by an explosive event at or immediately above or below the surface.

A crater is formed by an explosive event through the displacement and ejection of material from the ground.  It is typically bowl-shaped.  High-pressure gas and shock waves cause three processes responsible for the creation of the crater:

 Plastic deformation of the ground.
 Projection of material (ejecta) from the ground by the explosion.
 Spallation of the ground surface.

Two processes partially fill the crater back in:

 Fall-back of ejecta.
 Erosion and landslides of the crater lip and wall.

The relative importance of the five processes varies, depending on the height above or depth below the ground surface at which the explosion occurs and on the composition of the ground.

Examples 
One of the largest explosion craters in Germany is in the borough of Prüm. It was caused by a huge explosion in 1949, in which an ammunition depot exploded due to unknown causes and large parts of the town were destroyed.

References

See also 
Hydrothermal explosion, caused by rapid heating of groundwater by volcanic sources
Maar, a crater caused by a volcanic explosion
Pseudocrater, a volcanic crater formed by a steam explosion
Subsidence crater, a depression in the ground formed by collapse of a void below the surface
Impact crater, a depression formed by excavation following a hypervelocity impact
Volcanic crater